Boone-Withers House is a historic home located at Waynesville, Haywood County, North Carolina. It was built about 1883, and is a -story, Late Victorian style frame dwelling.  It has a large, two-story gabled wing and three smaller, two-story bays.  It features a one-story, hip roofed wraparound porch and two tall chimneys.

It was listed on the National Register of Historic Places in 1983.

References

Houses on the National Register of Historic Places in North Carolina
Victorian architecture in North Carolina
Houses completed in 1883
Houses in Haywood County, North Carolina
National Register of Historic Places in Haywood County, North Carolina
Waynesville, North Carolina